{{Infobox tennis biography
|name                              = Arthur Lowe
|image                             = Arthur holden lowe.jpg
|caption                           =Lowe in 1914
|fullname                          = Arthur Holden Lowe 
|country                           = United Kingdom
|residence                         = 
|birth_date                        = 
|birth_place                       = Edgbaston, Birmingham, England
|death_date                        = 
|death_place                       = London, England
|height                            = 
|college                           =
|turnedpro                         = 
|retired                           = 
|plays                             = 
|careerprizemoney                  = 
|tennishofyear                     = 
|tennishofid                       = 
|website                           = 
|singlesrecord                     = 
|singlestitles                     = 
|highestsinglesranking             = No. 7 (1914, A. Wallis Myers)
|AustralianOpenresult              = SF (1919)
|FrenchOpenresult                  = 
|Wimbledonresult                   = SF (1910)
|USOpenresult                      = 
|Othertournaments                  = 
|Olympicsresult                    = 
|doublesrecord                     = 
|doublestitles                     = 
|highestdoublesranking             = 
|currentdoublesranking             =
|AustralianOpenDoublesresult       = F (1919)
|FrenchOpenDoublesresult           = 
|WimbledonDoublesresult            = F (1914, 1921)
|USOpenDoublesresult               = 
|OthertournamentsDoubles           = 
|OlympicsDoublesresult             = 
|Mixed                             = yes
|mixedrecord                       = 
|mixedtitles                       = 
|AustralianOpenMixedresult         = 
|FrenchOpenMixedresult             = 
|WimbledonMixedresult              = 3R (1919)
|USOpenMixedresult                 = 
|OthertournamentsMixedDoubles      = 
|OlympicMixedDoublesresult         = 
}}Arthur Holden Lowe' (29 January 1886 – 22 October 1958) was an English tennis player.

Tennis career
Lowe competed in the 1912 Summer Olympics in both singles and doubles.

He was ranked World No. 7 in 1914 by A. Wallis Myers of The Daily Telegraph''.

Lowe won three titles at the Queen's Club, the pre-Wimbledon tournament, winning his first two back-to-back in 1913–14, and his third over 10 years later in 1925. In 1919 Lowe was runner-up in the Australian Open Men's Doubles with his partner James Anderson. In the singles, Lowe beat Pat O'Hara Wood in torrid heat, with one of the best displays of groundstrokes seen in Melbourne up to that point in time. He lost in the semi finals to Eric Pockley.

His brother Gordon Lowe was also a tennis player, and another brother John played first-class cricket.

Grand Slam finals

Doubles: (2 losses)

References

External links
 
 
 

1886 births
1958 deaths
English male tennis players
Olympic tennis players of Great Britain
People from Edgbaston
Tennis players at the 1912 Summer Olympics
British male tennis players
Tennis people from the West Midlands (county)
Younger sons of baronets